Gen'ichi or Genichi (written: 源一, 厳一, 玄一 or 元一) is a masculine Japanese given name. Notable people with the name include:

, Japanese footballer
, Japanese businessman
, Japanese botanist
, Japanese engineer and statistician
, Japanese footballer

See also
Won-il, a Korean masculine given name which may be written with the same Chinese characters

Japanese masculine given names